Paddinjattedathu Chacko John (1875–1943) was an evangelist and Bible teacher from the Indian State of Kerala. Raised among the Saint Thomas Christians, he joined the Plymouth Brethren as an adult, and is regarded today as one of the pioneers of the Kerala Brethren.

Birth & Family background
He was born in 1875  at Kumbanad, Kerala to Padinjattedathu Chacko of the Kumbanattu (also can be spelled Kumbanadu, kumbanad, kumbanadil or kumbanattil) family Padinjattedathil House. After a basic Malayalam education, he started his life as a farmer.  At the age of 16 he was married to Saramma of the Kuriannoor Pakalomattan Poozhikkalayil house family, a family with a paternal relation to k. V. Simon sir who was of the Pakalomattam Orethu family Kunnampurathu House. They had two sons, and six daughters. John died at the age of 66 in 1943.

Christian life and ministry
Although raised in a Christian household, John claimed that he never really understood the Christian message until he heard evangelist David Upadeshi  (Tamil David) speaking at the Maramon Mar Thoma Church. John made a commitment to follow Jesus Christ. He subsequently received Bible teaching from the Baptist Missionary J.G. Gregson in Ayroor. John began preaching while continuing with his occupation as a farmer.

John left the MarThoma Church after an altercation with the parish priest (one of John's uncles). John expressed disagreement with the priest's interpretation of Matthew 13.24-30; the priest taught that the "field" in the parable referred to the church, while John believed it referred to the world. On this Priest was very angry and hit him on one cheek. Then John showed the other cheek also. The priest hit him on the other cheek also. Then John kneeled down and started pray. At this time the priest pushed him down and hit him in both cheeks. When John reached home, his mother and wife started crying. John comforted them by reading to them from Acts 5:40, 41 "(And to him they agreed: and when they had called the apostles, and beaten them, they commanded that they should not speak in the name of Jesus, and let them go. And they departed from the presence of the council, rejoicing that they were counted worthy to suffer shame for his name.)" As his cousin P.E. Mammen heard about this, he called John and they spent a long time in prayer together. 

After that PE Mammen went to Kunnamkulam and was baptized by missionary Handley Bird. When P.E. Mammen came back, he baptized John.

Birth of Kerala Brethren
On 21 March 1899, John joined three other Christian men — his cousin P.E. Mammen, who had been a priest at the Mar Thoma Syrian Church, P.E. John, and Melathethil P.C. Chacko, in celebrating Holy Communion, or The Lord's Supper, as Brethren usually call it, in a private home. Many of the Kerala Brethren regard this event as the genesis of their movement in the state, although Brethren preachers had ministered there previously.

Missionary Ministry
After this John had dedicated himself for full-time Christian Ministry and he started his preaching ministry. He went to different places and preached the Gospel. In 1905 John began working with missionary Edwyn Hunter Noel. New churches were planted and Noel founded a school with John's help in Kumband. John was also instrumental in the effective merger of the Viyojitha churches with the Indian Brethren movement in 1929.

Family
John had two sons and six daughters. All his children became Christians and joined in fellowship with the churches. His eldest son Mathews B.A. worked as the correspondent of the schools and on his initiative the Malayalam School at Kumbanad became an English School and a high School. Mathews later moved to Chethackal (Ranni) from Kumbanad. Younger son Chacko B.A.; B.T worked as the Headmaster of the Noel Memorial High School, Kumbanad.

Further reading
 History of the Malankara Brethren Churches (Malankarayilae Verpadu Sabhakalude Charithram) by Mahakavi K.V. Simon, Chapter 16 Workers. Page 357–362 in the 1999 edition. This book was first published in November 1938 (Malayalam year 1114, Thulam), and republished by Sathyam Publications in Tiruvalla, Kerala, in February 1999.

1876 births
1937 deaths
Congregationalist missionaries in India
Indian Protestant missionaries
Indian Plymouth Brethren
People from Pathanamthitta district